The 2015 UEFA European Under-21 Championship qualification play-offs constituted the second and final round of the 2015 UEFA European Under-21 Championship qualification tournament. The ties were contested over two legs, with the first leg played on 9 and 10 October and the second leg played on 14 October 2014. The seven winners qualified for the final tournament in Czech Republic.

Seedings
The draw for the play-offs was held on 12 September 2014 in Nyon to determine the seven pairings as well as the order of the home and away ties. The seven group winners with the highest competition coefficients were seeded and those teams were drawn against the unseeded teams. Nations from the same group could not be drawn against each other.

Each nation's coefficient was generated by calculating:
40% of the average ranking points per game earned in the 2015 UEFA European Under-21 Championship qualifying group stage.
40% of the average ranking points per game earned in the 2013 UEFA European Under-21 Championship qualifying stage and final tournament.
20% of the average ranking points per game earned in the 2011 UEFA European Under-21 Championship qualifying stage and final tournament.

Seeded
 

Unseeded

Matches

|}

All times listed are CEST (UTC+02:00).

First leg

Second leg

Italy won 4–2 on aggregate.

England won 4–2 on aggregate.

Germany won 5–0 on aggregate.

Portugal won 7–4 on aggregate.

Serbia won 2–1 on aggregate.

1–1 on aggregate. Denmark won on away goals rule.

Sweden won 4–3 on aggregate.

References

External links
Fixtures at UEFA.com

Play-offs
UEFA European Under-21 Championship qualification play-offs